Epilobium brachycarpum is a species of willowherb known by the common names tall willowherb, tall annual willowherb, panicled willowherb and tall fireweed. It is native to and widespread in North America, where it is a resident of varied open and woodland habitats. It has also been introduced to some areas in South America. This is a tall glandular, hairy annual herb occasionally reaching two metres in height. It is somewhat gangly and thin like an erect weed, with narrow, curving, pointed leaves up to a few centimetres in length. The flower has four petals which may be so deeply notched that they look like four pairs. They are generally light purple or pink, with darker veining. The fruit is a capsule 1 to 3 centimetres long.

External links
Jepson Manual Treatment
Photo gallery

brachycarpum